2 Centauri is a single star in the southern constellation of Centaurus, located approximately 183 light-years from Earth. It has the Bayer designation g Centauri; 2 Centauri is the Flamsteed designation. This object is visible to the naked eye as faint, red-hued star with an apparent visual magnitude of 4.19. It is moving away from the Earth with a heliocentric radial velocity of +41 km/s. The star is a member of the HR 1614 supercluster.

This is an evolved red giant star with a stellar classification of M5 III. It is classified as a semiregular variable star and its brightness varies from magnitude +4.16 to +4.26 with a period of 12.57 days.

References

M-type giants
Asymptotic-giant-branch stars
Semiregular variable stars
Centaurus (constellation)
Centauri, g
Durchmusterung objects
Centauri, 2
120323
067457
5192
Centauri, V806